Bohinjska Bela is a village in the Municipality of Bled in the Upper Carniola region of Slovenia.

Geography
Bohinjska Bela lies on the left bank of the Sava Bohinjka River, southwest of Bled. The oldest part of the settlement, locally known as Spodnja vas or Dolenja vas ('lower village'), is believed to be over a thousand years old. The main part of the village is known as Zgornja vas or Gorenja vas ('upper village'). The train and bus stations are in the smallest part of the village, known locally as Podklanec. The Bohinjska Bela Barracks (with the Slovenian Military Mountain School and Multinational Centre of Excellence for Mountain Warfare) is located here.

Name
Bohinjska Bela was attested in written sources as Velach in 1253 and Vocheiner Velach in 1368, among other spellings.

Church

Saint Margaret's Church, dating from the 16th-century, stands in the part of the village known as Spodnja vas.

References

External links 

Bohinjska Bela at Geopedia

Populated places in the Municipality of Bled